Waylon Woolcock (born 8 July 1982 in Middelburg) is a South African professional mountain biker, riding for Team RE:CM Woolcock started cycling as a road rider at the age of 15 and turned professional at the age of 19. In 2007, he won his first major cycling tour, Tour d'Egypte. In 2008 he finished second in the South African National Road Race Championship. In 2011 to 2013, Woolcock took to mountain biking and in those years he won the JoBerg2c mountain bike stage race once and 2nd twice including nine stage wins in total. Woolcock's latest achievements are the MTN Crater Cruise Ultra Marathon and Cape Pioneer Trek stage race.

Achievements

2003
 National Team Representation
Under-23 Tour of Berlin, Germany
2004
 National Team Representation
Under-23 Tour of Berlin, Germany
Under-23 Turingen Rundfahrt, Germany
Under-23 World Championships, Italy
2005
 National Team Representation
 Tour d'Egypte
Tour of Qinghai Lakes, China
Tour of Senegal
2007
 1st Stage 3 Tour du Maroc
 1st Jock Cycle Classique
 Tour d'Egypte
1st Overall General Classification
1st Stage 3
 National Team Representation
Tour d'Egypte
Tour of Hainan, China
2008
 2nd SA National Road Race Championships
 1st Tour of Soweto
 National Team Representation
Tour de Langkawi
2011
 Sani2c
2nd Overall General Classification
1st Stage 3
 JoBerg2c
1st Overall General Classification
1st Stages 2,3,5,6,7 & 8
2012
 JoBerg2c
2nd Overall General Classification
1st Stages 5 & 9
2013
 JoBerg2c
2nd Overall General Classification
1st Stage 3
1st MTN Crater Cruise
 Cape Pioneer Trek
1st Overall General Classification

References

External links
Team RE:CM website
Crank website

1982 births
Living people
South African male cyclists
People from Stellenbosch
White South African people
South African mountain bikers
Sportspeople from the Western Cape